Annur is a town Panchayat and Taluk headquarters of Annur Taluk of coimbatore district. Annur has a police station in the Karumathampatti sub division.

Etymology
The name Annur is believed to have been come from "Vanniyur", later transformed to Anniyur and now to Annur. The myth behind the name says that, over 1000 years ago, when a small hunter hit a stone under a "Vanni" tree, it started bleeding. He was astonished and called the village people to look after this issue. Later they found a "Suyambu" Lord Shiva Idol there and built the Manneeshwarar temple.

Economy 
There are a large number of textile mills situated in the Annur region. Pioneers in setting up textile mills in the Annur region were the KG group founded by K govindaswamy naidu also known as KG. There are several educational institutions operational under KG group in Annur.

Geography 
It has an average elevation of 338 metres (1108 feet). Annur is well connected by roads including the National Highway 209 (New NH948) (Coimbatore to Bangalore highway) and the State Highway 80 SH80 Avanashi to Mettupalayam passes through Annur.

Demographics

According to 2011 census taken by the Government of India, Annur had a population of 20,079, of which, males constitute 9,971 and females constitute 10,108. Annur has a literacy rate of 80.93%.

References

Cities and towns in Coimbatore district
Coimbatore district